Constanzo is an Italian given name or surname. Notable people with the name include:

Given name
Constanzo Beschi (1860–1747), Italian jesuit priest, missionary, and Tamil language littérateur
Constanzo Festa (c. 1485/1490–1545), Italian composer
Constanzo Mangini (1918–1981), Italian ice hockey player

Surname
Adolfo Constanzo (1962–1989), American serial killer, drug trafficker, and cult leader
Carmine Constanzo (died 1997), actor and father of Robert Costanzo
Steve Constanzo (born 1988), Australian basketball player
Ted Constanzo (born c. 1956), American former football player

See also
Costanzo

Given names
Surnames
Italian-language surnames
Italian masculine given names